Marko Šćepović (born 23 May 1991) is a Serbian professional footballer who plays as a striker for Spanish club Lugo.

Club career

Early career
Born in Belgrade, Šćepović graduated from FK Partizan's youth setup, after stints at Spanish CP Mérida and FK Rad. He made his debuts as a senior with FK Teleoptik, the former's farm team, scoring regularly in his second campaign.

Partizan
In the summer of 2010 Šćepović was promoted to the main squad, and signed his first professional contract. In his first season under Aleksandar Stanojević, he split appearances with fellow forwards, Lamine Diarra, Eduardo Pacheco, and Lazar Marković.

Šćepović scored his first professional goal on 4 September 2010, netting the last of a 2–0 home success against FK Hajduk Kula. On 29 October of the following year, after netting the second in a 3–1 win against FK Smederevo, he gestured with his finger on his lips to "hush" some spectators in the east tribune of Partizan Stadium which had provoked him during the match. He also scored in Partizan's 2–0 win in the Eternal Derby against Red Star Belgrade on 26 November, being also given the Man of the Match award by Serbian newspaper Sportal.

Armband affair
On 6 August 2013, after captaining Partizan in a 0–1 UEFA Champions League home loss to Ludogorets Razgrad (1-3 aggregate loss), a Grobari leader named Miloš "Kimi" Radisavljević jumped down onto the pitch and removed the armband of Šćepović's arm. On 7 August, the scandal became even more controversial when a media conference was held with Radisavljević and Šćepović, with the former claiming to the press that he did not "aggressively" take the armband, and that he and the latter were "friends".

In spite of the bizarre media conference and Šćepović passively agreeing with Radisavljević in the conference, criminologist Zlatko Nikolić of Serbia's Criminal and Social Research Institute gave voice to a widespread public suspicion that the conference was staged and that Šćepović was humiliated and may have been threatened to agree with the latter in the conference. Despite the Serbian Ministry of Internal Affairs promising to investigate the matter thoroughly, Radisavljević was released after a 90-minute interrogation by the police. About the incident, Milutin Šoškić said, "We have imported hooliganism from England, but we don't have a Margaret Thatcher to neutralize it."

Olympiacos
On 2 September 2013, Šćepović signed a four-year deal with Olympiacos, for a €3.5 million fee. On 22 February 2014, he scored his first hat-trick in his career, in a 4–0 away win against OFI Crete.

Despite scoring four goals for the Greek outfit, Šćepović only started in seven matches during the whole campaign, totalling 650 minutes of action.

Mallorca (loan)
On 20 August 2014, Šćepović was loaned to Spanish Segunda División side RCD Mallorca in a season-long deal. An undisputed starter during the beginning of the campaign, he scored braces against CA Osasuna and CD Lugo.

Terek Grozny (loan)
On 25 February 2015, Šćepović joined FC Terek Grozny on loan for the remainder of the 2014–15 season.

Royal Mouscron-Péruwelz (loan)
In August 2015 Šćepović joined Royal Mouscron-Péruwelz on loan from Olympiakos.

Fehérvár
On 30 August 2016, Šćepović signed a three-year contract with Fehérvár.

Later career
On 30 August 2019, Šćepović signed a three-year contract with Turkish Süper Lig club Çaykur Rizespor. He subsequently played for Thai club Buriram United in 2020, and for Cypriot side Omonia during the 2021–22 season.

On 6 February 2023, after more than six months without a club, Šćepović signed a short-term deal with Lugo in the Spanish second division.

International career
On 12 October 2012, Šćepović made his debut for the Serbian national team in a FIFA World Cup qualifier against Belgium. Šćepović started the game against Croatia in a FIFA World Cup qualifier.

Personal life
Šćepović is the son of former Partizan striker Slađan Šćepović, and the younger brother of another professional football striker, Stefan Šćepović.

Career statistics

Club

International

Honours

Club
Partizan Belgrade
 Serbian SuperLiga: 2010–11, 2011–12, 2012–13
 Serbian Cup: 2010–11

Olympiacos
 Super League Greece: 2013–14

Videoton
 Nemzeti Bajnokság I: 2017–18
 Magyar Kupa: 2018–19

Omonia
 Cypriot First Division: 2020–21
 Cypriot Cup: 2021–22
 Cypriot Super Cup: 2021

Notes and references

External links
 
 

1991 births
Living people
Footballers from Belgrade
Serbian footballers
Association football forwards
Serbian SuperLiga players
FK Teleoptik players
FK Partizan players
Super League Greece players
Olympiacos F.C. players
Expatriate footballers in Greece
Expatriate footballers in Spain
Segunda División players
RCD Mallorca players
Russian Premier League players
FC Akhmat Grozny players
Expatriate footballers in Russia
Belgian Pro League players
Royal Excel Mouscron players
Fehérvár FC players
Expatriate footballers in Hungary
Nemzeti Bajnokság I players
Expatriate footballers in Belgium
Serbia under-21 international footballers
Serbia international footballers
Serbian expatriate footballers
Serbian expatriate sportspeople in Belgium
Serbian expatriate sportspeople in Greece
Serbian expatriate sportspeople in Spain
Serbian expatriate sportspeople in Hungary
Serbia youth international footballers
AC Omonia players
CD Lugo players